Aysanoa Runachagua is a film actor.

He appeared along Tchang Yu, Tom Felleghi and Franco Morici in Massacre Time (1966), by Lucio Fulci. He played Pistolero Recruited by Tuco in the Cave in Il buono il bruto il cattivo (1966), by Sergio Leone; and Mexican hired gun in The Stranger Returns (1967), by Luigi Vanzi.

Filmography

References

External links
 
 

Male Spaghetti Western actors
20th-century male actors